Arshad Pervez (born 1 October 1953) is a former Pakistani cricketer who played two One Day Internationals in 1978.

References 
 

1953 births
Living people
Habib Bank Limited cricketers
Pakistan One Day International cricketers
Sargodha cricketers
Pakistani cricketers
Cricketers from Sargodha
Lahore A cricketers
Punjab A cricketers
Pakistan Universities cricketers
Service Industries cricketers
Punjab (Pakistan) cricketers